1930 was the 37th season of County Championship cricket in England and will always be remembered for the remarkable batting performances of Australia's Don Bradman. Australia won the Test series 2–1. Lancashire regained the championship to complete four titles in five seasons.

Honours
County Championship – Lancashire
Minor Counties Championship – Durham
Wisden – Don Bradman, Clarrie Grimmett, Beverley Lyon, Ian Peebles, Maurice Turnbull

Test series

England lost the Ashes to Australia by 2–1 with two matches drawn.  Australia needed to win the final Test at The Oval to win the series and regain the Ashes, and did so by an innings in a match that went into the sixth day (as the series was in doubt, it was to be played to a finish). Don Bradman, with 974 runs in the series (unequalled in all Test cricket), was the main difference between two strong teams. Clarrie Grimmett took 29 wickets in the series, though - oddly - ten of those were in the only Test that Australia lost (the first).

County Championship

Leading batsmen

Leading bowlers
Charlie Parker was the leading bowler with 179 wickets @ 12.84 though Tich Freeman took 275 wickets @ 16.84.

 With more than 20 first-class wickets.

References

Annual reviews
 Wisden Cricketers' Almanack 1931

Further reading
 Bill Frindall, The Wisden Book of Test Cricket 1877-1978, Wisden, 1979
 Chris Harte, A History of Australian Cricket, Andre Deutsch, 1993
 Ray Robinson, On Top Down Under, Cassell, 1975
 Ralph Barker & Irving Rosenwater, England v Australia: A compendium of Test cricket between the countries 1877-1968, Batsford, 1969,

External links
 CricketArchive – season summary

1930 in English cricket
English cricket seasons in the 20th century